Mitogen-activated protein kinase 3, also known as p44MAPK and ERK1, is an enzyme that in humans is encoded by the MAPK3 gene.

Function 

The protein encoded by this gene is a member of the mitogen-activated protein kinase (MAP kinase) family. MAP kinases, also known as extracellular signal-regulated kinases (ERKs), act in a signaling cascade that regulates various cellular processes such as proliferation, differentiation, and cell cycle progression in response to a variety of extracellular signals. This kinase is activated by upstream kinases, resulting in its translocation to the nucleus where it phosphorylates nuclear targets. Alternatively spliced transcript variants encoding different protein isoforms have been described.

Clinical significance 

It has been suggested that MAPK3, along with the gene IRAK1, is turned off by two microRNAs that were activated after the influenza A virus had been made to infect human lung cells.

Signaling pathways 

Pharmacological inhibition of ERK1/2 restores GSK3β activity and protein synthesis levels in a model of tuberous sclerosis.

Interactions 

MAPK3 has been shown to interact with:

 DUSP3, 
 DUSP6 
 GTF2I, 
 HDAC4, 
 MAP2K1, 
 MAP2K2,
 PTPN7, 
 RPS6KA2,  and
 SPIB.

References

Further reading

External links 
 MAP Kinase Resource  .

EC 2.7.11